Club Deportivo Ciudad de Lucena is a Spanish football team based in Lucena, Córdoba, in the autonomous community of Andalusia. Founded in 2008, it plays in Tercera División RFEF – Group 10, holding home matches at Estadio Ciudad de Lucena.

Season to season

4 seasons in Tercera División
1 season in Tercera División RFEF

References

External links
 
Soccerway team profile

Football clubs in Andalusia
Association football clubs established in 2008
2008 establishments in Spain
Province of Córdoba (Spain)